Connors State College is a public community college in Warner and Muskogee, Oklahoma.

History 
The college was founded as an agricultural high school in 1908 and was quickly converted to a school of agriculture.

When Oklahoma became a state in 1907, the Oklahoma Constitution specified that the state should have an agricultural school in each of the State Supreme Court Judicial Districts. These schools would be granted at least , and be overseen by Oklahoma's Board of Agriculture. In the First Judicial District, Warner, Oklahoma vied with Muskogee as the school location. Led by State Senator Campbell Russell, Warner residents donated  for the school and Warner won the competition. The school was named in honor of John P. Connors, the Board of Agriculture's first president.

In March 1927, the Oklahoma Legislature made the school an accredited junior college and renamed it as Connors State Agricultural College. In 1941, the school was put under the oversight of newly created Oklahoma State System of Higher Education. In 1944, it was transferred to the Board of Regents for Agricultural and Mechanical Colleges. It was again renamed as Connors State College of Agriculture and Applied Science in 1967.

Campuses 
The college has two sites, in Warner and Muskogee, Oklahoma.

Academics 
The school offers certificates and associate degrees.

Athletics
The Connors State athletic teams are called the Cowboys and Cowgirls. The college is a member of the National Junior College Athletic Association (NJCAA), primarily competing in the Bi-State Conference within the NJCAA Region 2.

Connors State competes in 11 intercollegiate varsity sports: Men's sports include baseball, basketball and cross country; while women's sports include basketball, cheerleading, cross country and softball; and co-ed sports include dance, rodeo, shooting sports and stunt.

Notable people 

 George Kottaras - Catcher, Milwaukee Brewers, Major League Baseball.
 Julio Lugo - Shortstop, Baltimore Orioles, Major League Baseball
 Jordan Romano - Relief Pitcher, Toronto Blue Jays, Major League Baseball

References

External links
 Official website
 Official athletics website
 Encyclopedia of Oklahoma History and Culture - Connors State College

 
Buildings and structures in Muskogee County, Oklahoma
Education in Muskogee County, Oklahoma
Educational institutions established in 1908
Buildings and structures in Muskogee, Oklahoma
1908 establishments in Oklahoma
Community colleges in Oklahoma
NJCAA athletics